Hongshih (born as Hong Shih-han on 7 January 1988) is a Taiwanese actress and singer who is a member of girl group Popu Lady. She entered the entertainment industry in 2005 hosting music programs and being part of the audition show Blackie's Teenage Club, but wasn't chosen as a member of new girl group Hey Girl. She graduated in hotel management from Jinwen University of Science and Technology.

In 2016, she starred in TV series Behind Your Smile.

Filmography

Television

Film

References

External links

1988 births
Living people
Actresses from Taipei
21st-century Taiwanese actresses
21st-century Taiwanese singers
Taiwanese film actresses
Taiwanese television actresses
21st-century Taiwanese women singers